Played is the sole album by English band The Bodines, released in 1987 by record label Magnet.

References

External links 
 

1987 debut albums